72 Tenants of Prosperity (72家租客) is a 2010 Hong Kong comedy film produced by the Shaw Brothers Studio, Television Broadcasts Limited, United Filmmakers Organization, Sil-Metropole Organisation and Sun Wah Media Group. It was directed by Eric Tsang and stars Tsang himself and various other actors. It was released in Hong Kong, Malaysia, Australia, and New Zealand on 11 February 2010.

This film used the 1973 film The House of 72 Tenants as a blueprint. However, this story is a new creation, of which only some roles identical. This is the first film to introduce the new 2010 Shaw opening theme with a shortened version of the original fanfare.

The film spoofs other movies such as Ip Man and Murderer, and makes references to Hong Kong culture and events that were figured in the media that year, such as the death of Michael Jackson and the Mong Kok acid attacks.

Plot
In 1970s Hong Kong, rapacious landlords try to evict 72 tenants but sworn brothers Ha Kung and Shek Kin help the group of 72 defeat the landlord and landlady and coincidentally rescue Pinky from a planned forced marriage. When both sworn brothers fall for Pinky and propose to her, she flips a coin heads or tails, they both cheated during the toss but Ha wins her hand in marriage.

The sworn brothers become sworn enemies and Sheks hatred fuels intense rivalry against Ha in business dealings ranging from the manufacture of plastic flowers to the selling of stinky bean curd. Even after 40 years they continue to clash and in 2010 they are in keen competition selling electronics appliances in Sai Yeung Choi Street, Mongkok, the busiest street in the city and still home to the 72 tenants.

In fiercely competitive Sai Yeung Choi Street high rents force businessmen to use every means to survive, with electronics shops employing pseudo models in sales promotion campaigns and comic shops offering foot-massage services by Lolita, etc. These ploys are minor compared with the tactics of the landlord who threatens to close down the shops unless his demands for tripled rent are met. Amidst this strife and struggle the street is hit by acid-attacks and in high spirits the 72 tenants unite and pledge to safeguard their home.

Against a background of fear and turmoil, with the old love triangle between Ha and Pinky and Shek still festering, the next generation of the Ha and Shek families generate their own love affairs: MJ-style dancer Ha Junior is fascinated by Shek's daughter who is a Japanese AV culture fan; Ha's daughter, a kung fu expert, is pursued by Shek's love-struck son, the smart shortie. Affairs of the heart yet to be resolved.

Cast

The Ha family

The Shek family

The Tai family

Hoi Phone Fu

Ting Tai Phone

Other cast

1960s

2010

External links
 Official website
 
K for TVB 72 Tenants of Prosperity - Movie Info & Screencaptures 
/ HKMDB 72 Tenants of Prosperity - Movie Info & Casting photos

2010 films
2010s Cantonese-language films
Hong Kong comedy films
2010 comedy films
Shaw Brothers Studio films
Films directed by Patrick Kong
Films directed by Eric Tsang
Chinese New Year films